Chad Andrew Readler (born August 23, 1972) is an American lawyer who serves as a United States circuit judge of the United States Court of Appeals for the Sixth Circuit. He previously served as a principal deputy and former acting assistant attorney general for the United States Department of Justice Civil Division.

Education 
Readler graduated from the University of Michigan in 1994. He attended the Ohio State University Moritz College of Law for one year, then transferred to the University of Michigan Law School, where he was an editor of the University of Michigan Journal of Law Reform. He graduated in 1997 with a Juris Doctor degree cum laude.

Legal career 
After graduating from law school, Readler served as a law clerk for Judge Alan Eugene Norris of the Sixth Circuit from 1997 to 1998. From 1998 to 2017, Reader was in private practice at the law firm Jones Day in its Columbus, Ohio, office, becoming a partner in 2007. While at Jones Day, Readler represented the R. J. Reynolds Tobacco Company.

He also successfully argued before the Supreme Court of the United States in McQuiggin v. Perkins on behalf of a pro bono client claiming actual innocence. His other pro bono representations include representing capital defendants before the United States Court of Appeals for the Tenth Circuit and the Supreme Court of Ohio, representing defendants sentenced to life in prison before the Sixth Circuit, and challenging dismissals of claims filed by pro se litigants.

Prior to becoming a judge, Readler was principal deputy United States assistant attorney general for the United States Department of Justice Civil Division, a position he held beginning on January 30, 2017. Readler previously served as acting United States assistant attorney general for the Civil Division from January 2017 to September 2018. In that role, Readler led and supervised the Department's largest litigating division and actively briefed and argued several cases on behalf of the United States in federal courts across the country.

Controversy 
Readler was involved in some of the most high-profile and controversial cases in the Trump administration. For example, Readler defended the Trump administration's attempt to add a citizenship question on the 2020 Census, based on Readler's allegation that the Department of Justice had requested the Department of Commerce to add the question. The Supreme Court later determined that false, "ruling that the justification that the government offered at the time for including the citizenship question was just a pretext."

Previously, Readler represented R.J. Reynolds Tobacco Company in challenging a Buffalo, New York restriction prohibiting tobacco ads from appearing within 1,000 feet of schools, playgrounds, and day-care centers. Readler argued that Reynolds had a First Amendment right to advertise tobacco products within 1,000 feet of schools, playgrounds, and day-care centers.

Federal judicial service 
On June 7, 2018, President Donald Trump announced his intent to nominate Readler to serve as a United States Circuit Judge of the United States Court of Appeals for the Sixth Circuit. On June 18, 2018, his nomination was sent to the Senate. President Trump nominated Readler to the seat being vacated by Judge Deborah L. Cook, who previously announced her intention to assume senior status on a date to be determined. In June 2018, U.S. Senator Sherrod Brown said he did not plan to return a blue slip for Readler's nomination, while U.S. Senator Rob Portman said he planned to support Readler's nomination. On October 10, 2018, a hearing on his nomination was held before the Senate Judiciary Committee.

During his confirmation hearing, Democrats criticized Readler for having supported a Republican lawsuit aimed at dismantling the Affordable Care Act, including its protections for individuals with pre-existing conditions.

On January 3, 2019, his nomination was returned to the President under Rule XXXI, Paragraph 6 of the United States Senate. He was renominated on January 23, 2019. On February 7, 2019, his nomination was reported out of committee by a 12–10 vote. On March 5, 2019, the Senate voted to invoke cloture on the nomination by a 53–45 vote. On March 6, 2019, his nomination was confirmed by a 52–47 vote. He received his judicial commission on March 7, 2019.

Memberships 
Readler is a member of the Federalist Society.

See also 
 Donald Trump judicial appointment controversies

References

External links 
 
 
 Appearances at the U.S. Supreme Court from the Oyez Project

|-

1972 births
Living people
20th-century American lawyers
21st-century American lawyers
21st-century American judges
Federalist Society members
Jones Day people
Judges of the United States Court of Appeals for the Sixth Circuit
Ohio lawyers
People from Pontiac, Michigan
Trump administration personnel
United States Assistant Attorneys General for the Civil Division
United States court of appeals judges appointed by Donald Trump
United States Department of Justice lawyers
University of Michigan College of Literature, Science, and the Arts alumni
University of Michigan Law School alumni